The mottled triplefin, Forsterygion malcolmi, is a triplefin of the genus Forsterygion, found around New Zealand at depths down to 30 m, in reef areas of broken rock. Its specific name honours Malcolm Francis of the Fisheries Research Centre in Wellington, New Zealand, who joined Hardy on his trips to collect specimens.

References

 
 Tony Ayling & Geoffrey Cox, Collins Guide to the Sea Fishes of New Zealand,  (William Collins Publishers Ltd, Auckland, New Zealand 1982) 

Mottled triplefin
Endemic marine fish of New Zealand
Fish described in 1987